The following is the discography of Goldfinger, a Los Angeles-based punk rock band formed in 1994 by John Feldmann on vocals and guitar, Simon Williams on bass, former drummer of Buffalo NY's Zero Tolerance Darrin Pfeiffer on drums, and Charlie Paulson on guitar. The band released six studio albums between 1996 and 2008, as well as three live albums, a compilation album, four extended plays, seventeen singles, and sixteen music videos.

The band released their self-titled debut album in 1996, which featured their biggest hit, "Here in Your Bedroom", which reached number five on the U.S. Billboard Hot Modern Rock Tracks chart, and within the top 15 on RPM Alternative 30 in Canada. Their second album, Hang-Ups (1997), represented their biggest chart position on the Billboard 200 at number 85, and featured the song "Superman", which became well-known for its appearance in the video game Tony Hawk's Pro Skater (1999). 

Their next album, Stomping Ground (2000), featured a cover of Nenas' "99 Red Balloons", which was licensed on a number of movie soundtracks. Subsequent albums—Open Your Eyes (2002), Disconnection Notice (2005), and Hello Destiny... (2008)—did not fare as well, and the band temporarily ceased recording music, instead becoming an occasional touring act. In 2017, they released their comeback album The Knife. In 2020, they released their eighth studio album, titled Never Look Back.

Albums

Studio albums

Live albums

Compilation albums

Extended plays

Singles

Videography
 Here in Your Bedroom (1996)
 Mable (1996)
 Only A Day (1996)
 This Lonely Place (1997)
 More Today Than Yesterday (1998)
 Feel Like Making Love (1999)
 Counting The Days (2000)
 San Simeon (2000)
 99 Red Balloons (2000)
 Open Your Eyes (2002)
 Spokesman (2002)
 Tell Me (2002)
 Wasted (2005)
 I Want (2005)
 Too Many Nights (2005)
 One More Time (2008)
 Tijuana Sunrise (2018)
 A Million Miles (2018)
 Rudolph the Red-Nosed Reindeer (2018)
 Wallflower (2020)
 Nothing To Me (2020)

Compilation appearances

Soundtrack appearances

Video game appearances

References

External links
 Official website
 Goldfinger at AllMusic
 

Punk rock group discographies
Discographies of American artists